Tea is a given name. It is a feminine name in Indo-European languages and is cognate to the names Theia, Thea and Téa. Masculine usage is found in Oceania.

Notable people with the feminine name include:

 Tea Alagic (born 1972), Bosnian-American theatre director
 Tea Donguzashvili (born 1976), Russian judoka of Georgian origin, 2004 Olympic bronze medalist
 Tea Falco (born 1986), Italian actress, birth name Teresa
 Tea Grubišić (born 1985), Croatian handball player
 Tea Gueci (born 1999), Italian chess player
 Tea Hiilloste (born 1982), Finnish singer
 Tea Ista (1932–2014), Finnish actress, birth name Dorothea
 Tea Jorjadze (born 1971), Georgian artist
 Tea Lanchava (born 1974), Georgian-Dutch chess player
 Tea Mäkipää (born 1973), Finnish artist
 Tea Marinović (born 1999), Montenegrin handball player
 Tea Bajraktarević (born 1985), Serbian-American novelist better known as Téa Obreht
 Tea Palić (born 1991), Croatian alpine skier
 Tea Pedić (born 1996), Croatian footballer
 Tea Pijević (born 1991), Croatian handball player
 Tea Sugareva (born 1989), Bulgarian theatre director, drama teacher and poet
 Tea Tairović (born 1996), Serbian singer
 Tea Tulić (born 1978), Croatian writer
 Tea Ugrin (born 1998), Italian artistic gymnast
 Tea Vikstedt-Nyman (born 1959), Finnish racing cyclist
 Tea Villilä (born 1991), Finnish ice hockey player

Notable people with the masculine name include:

 Tea Ropati (born 1964), rugby league footballer from New Zealand and Western Samoa
 Tea Tooala Peato (born ~1940), Samoan politician

See also
 

Feminine given names
Masculine given names
Finnish feminine given names